This is a list of members of the Western Australian Legislative Council from 22 May 1938 to 21 May 1940. The chamber had 30 seats made up of ten provinces each electing three members, on a system of rotation whereby one-third of the members would retire at each biennial election.

Terms expiring in 1942 and thereafter were extended due to World War II by the Legislative Council (Postponement of Election) Act 1941 (No. 50 of 1941), which was given assent on 16 January 1942.

Sources
 
 
 

Members of Western Australian parliaments by term